Enrique Fernando Correa Ríos (born 14 November 1945) is a Chilean politician who served as minister of State under Patricio Aylwin's government (1994–2000) and Director of the Latin American Faculty of Social Sciences.

References

External links
 Profile at Annales de la República

1945 births
Living people
Chilean people
Chilean philosophers
Christian Democratic Party (Chile) politicians
Popular Unitary Action Movement politicians
Members of the MAPU Obrero Campesino
Socialist Party of Chile politicians
Pontifical Catholic University of Chile alumni